"Let Go" is a song recorded and produced by Japanese hip-hop trio M-Flo, featuring Yoshika. It was released as the first single for the group's fourth studio album Beat Space Nine (2005) through Rhythm Zone on November 17, 2004. The release contains a B-side track titled "The Other Side of Love", as well as instrumental versions of both songs.

Despite peaking at only number 12 on the Oricon Singles Chart upon its release, "Let Go" was certified multiple times by the Recording Industry Association of Japan (RIAJ) in various categories. including triple platinum for full-length ringtone downloads (chaku-uta full) and double platinum for digital downloads. The single has sold over 124,000 physical copies since its release.

Other usage 
On January 22, 2014, Japanese girl group Flower released a sequel version of the song titled "Let Go Again" as part of their self-titled debut album, featuring vocals from Verbal.

Track listing  
 CD single
 "Let Go" — 5:57
 "The Other Side of Love" — 5:31
 "Let Go" (Instrumental) — 5:56
 "The Other Side of Love" (Instrumental) — 5:31

Charts

Sales and certifications

References 

M-Flo songs
2001 singles
2001 songs